

Description 

Zhen Hua 33 is a Chinese-flagged semi-submersible heavy lift ship designed to carry large cargo, including other vessels and offshore rigs, on her  cargo deck.

Stockholm "Golden Bridge" 

In early 2020, Zhen Hua 33 became semi-famous in Sweden for carrying Guldbron to replace the old traffic interchange at Slussen in Stockholm, manufactured by China Railway Shanhaiguan Bridge Group on behalf of Skanska, the contractors for the remodelled Slussen. She was eventually able to continue towards Sweden at the beginning of March, and arrived in Stockholm on 11 March 2020.

References 

2017 ships
Heavy lift ships
Semi-submersibles
Ships built in China